Volodymyr Ivanovych Kulish (born 11 February 1963, in Khotin, Ukraine), is a Ukrainian politician.

In 2005-06 he served as a Presidential representative of Ukraine in Crimea.

References

External links
 Volodymyr Kulish at the Chernivetska Oblast State Administration website.
 Volodymyr Kulish at Liga.Dossier

1963 births
Living people
People from Sumy Oblast
Presidential representatives of Ukraine in Crimea
Governors of Chernivtsi Oblast
Taras Shevchenko National University of Kyiv alumni
Komsomol of Ukraine members
Our Ukraine (political party) politicians